Mikhail Vyacheslavovich Dorinov (born 9 August 1995) is a Russian swimmer. He competed in the men's 200 metre breaststroke event at the 2018 FINA World Swimming Championships (25 m), in Hangzhou, China.

References

External links
 

1995 births
Living people
Russian male swimmers
Male breaststroke swimmers
Place of birth missing (living people)
Medalists at the FINA World Swimming Championships (25 m)
Universiade medalists in swimming
Universiade silver medalists for Russia
Medalists at the 2017 Summer Universiade